This is lists of DC Comics fictional characters.

Alphabetically
List of DC Comics characters: 0–9
List of DC Comics characters: A
List of DC Comics characters: B
List of DC Comics characters: C
List of DC Comics characters: D
List of DC Comics characters: E
List of DC Comics characters: F
List of DC Comics characters: G
List of DC Comics characters: H
List of DC Comics characters: I
List of DC Comics characters: J
List of DC Comics characters: K
List of DC Comics characters: L
List of DC Comics characters: M
List of DC Comics characters: N
List of DC Comics characters: O
List of DC Comics characters: P
List of DC Comics characters: Q
List of DC Comics characters: R
List of DC Comics characters: S
List of DC Comics characters: T
List of DC Comics characters: U
List of DC Comics characters: V
List of DC Comics characters: W
List of DC Comics characters: X
List of DC Comics characters: Y
List of DC Comics characters: Z

By type
List of 100 Bullets characters
List of Amalgam Comics characters
List of Aquaman enemies
List of Aquaman supporting characters
List of Batman family enemies
List of Batman supporting characters
List of Black Canary characters
List of Blue Beetle enemies
List of The Books of Magic characters
List of Bulletman enemies
List of alien races in DC Comics
Characters of the DC Extended Universe
List of DMZ characters
List of Doom Patrol enemies
List of Doomsday Clock characters
List of Fables characters
List of Firestorm enemies
List of Flash enemies
List of Flashpoint (comics) characters
List of Green Arrow supporting characters
List of Green Arrow enemies
List of Green Lantern enemies
List of Green Lantern supporting characters
List of Hawkman enemies
List of Hellblazer characters
List of DC Comics Hitman characters
List of Ibis the Invincible enemies
List of Justice League enemies
List of Justice Society of America enemies
List of The League of Extraordinary Gentlemen characters
List of Legion of Super-Heroes enemies
List of Earth-Two characters
List of Flash supporting characters
List of Kingdom Come (comics) characters
List of The American Way characters
List of metahumans in DC Comics
List of Metal Men enemies
List of Metal Men members
List of Planetary characters
List of Preacher characters
Rogues (comics)
List of The Sandman characters
List of Starman characters
List of Superman enemies
List of Superman supporting characters
List of Teen Titans enemies
List of Top 10 characters
List of Watchmen characters
List of Wonder Woman supporting characters
List of Wonder Woman enemies
List of Y: The Last Man characters

External links

 DC Comics official site